Simon Liekele Eeltje Duiker (16 April 1874, Amsterdam – 6 March 1941, Amsterdam) was a Dutch painter.

Duiker lived and worked in Amsterdam while studying at its National Academy. He painted interior scenes and still life paintings. His work depicts middle class Dutch life, particularly men and women at work in the home.

Duiker was greatly influenced by the work of Jan Vermeer. Duiker, along with Jacques Snoeck and Gijbertus Jan Sijhoff, is considered one of the last great Dutch interior scene painters. Duiker's paintings are part of the Dutch National Collection (Rijkscollectie).

References

Duiker, Simon at the RKD databases.

1874 births
1941 deaths
Painters from Amsterdam
20th-century Dutch painters
Dutch male painters
20th-century Dutch male artists